Tukoroirangi "Tuku" Morgan (born 7 October 1957) is a New Zealand Māori politician and former broadcaster.

Early life and family
Born in Auckland on 7 October 1957, Morgan affiliates to the Tainui iwi confederation. He was educated at St Stephen's School, Bombay from 1970 to 1971, and Huntly College from 1971 to 1976. He then gained a Diploma of Teaching, and taught English and Māori studies at Huntly College from 1980 to 1982, and Birkdale College (1982). His brother-in-law is Tau Henare.

Broadcasting
Morgan worked as news and current affairs reporter at both Television New Zealand and TV3. He was also head of sport, youth and current affairs programmes at the short-lived Aotearoa Television Network.

Member of Parliament

Morgan was first elected to Parliament in the 1996 election as the New Zealand First MP for Te Tai Hauāuru. New Zealand First captured all five Māori electorates in the 1996 election (including Te Tai Hauāuru) - Morgan and the other four Māori MPs became known as the Tight Five.

During his term in Parliament he was involved in a number of controversies. One scandal in 1997 revolved around his spending NZ$4000 of Aotearoa Television funds on clothes including a pair of $89 underpants.

Morgan resigned from New Zealand First on 18 August 1998, becoming an independent MP. He later joined the newly formed Mauri Pacific. In the 1999 election, Morgan was ranked second on Mauri Pacific's party list, and contested the Te Tai Hauāuru seat again, but was not returned to Parliament. He then returned to television and film production.

Life after parliament
He was chair of Te Arataura, the Waikato-Tainui executive board, from 2006 until 2012, except for a period in 2004 when he was removed from office because of a criminal conviction for obstructing police during a protest march in the 1980s. He is a director of Auckland Council Property, a council-controlled organisation of the Auckland Council.

In 2015 he became the Māori Party's co-chair of the Hauraki-Waikato electorate. In July 2016 he was elected as president of the Māori Party.

In December 2017 he announced his resignation and called for the party's co-leaders to follow suit after the Māori Party gained just 1.1 percent of the party vote at the 2017 General election and all seven of its Māori electorate candidates were beaten by Labour.

In August 2018, he published an open letter to the Māori King Tūheitia Paki, whose advisor he had previously been, detailing a number of criticisms of Paki's behaving, including his continued support and employment of Rangi Whakaruru as chief of staff.

References

1957 births
Living people
New Zealand First MPs
New Zealand television producers
Mauri Pacific MPs
Independent MPs of New Zealand
New Zealand MPs for Māori electorates
Waikato Tainui people
Māori politicians
Members of the New Zealand House of Representatives
Unsuccessful candidates in the 1999 New Zealand general election
Māori Party politicians
21st-century New Zealand politicians